Grillis is a hamlet in the parish of Carn Brea, Cornwall, England.

References

Hamlets in Cornwall